Club Social y Deportivo Yupanqui is an Argentine football club that currently plays in the Primera C Metropolitana, the fourth division of the Argentine league system. The club was named by searching for unusual words in the dictionary. Yupanqui was picked up because the meaning of the Quechua word, "the posterity will talk about you".

History 
Yupanqui gained some notoriety in Argentina after a Coca-Cola television advertisement where it was referred to as the club with the least fans in Argentina.

Before the Coca-Cola advertisement, the average number of fans that would show up to each game was between 5 and 7. After the advertisement, about 50 new club members joined. Even after the spike in recognition, the money they made was used for several projects such as restoring bathrooms, build a theater, a chess room, and the soccer team didn't receive any funding, even though they were solely responsible for all the recognition the club had received.

Players

References

External links

 
Association football clubs established in 1935
Football clubs in Buenos Aires
1935 establishments in Argentina